Achada Leitão is a settlement in the central part of the island of Santiago, Cape Verde. It is part of the municipality São Salvador do Mundo. It is situated 3 km northeast of Picos.

References

São Salvador do Mundo, Cape Verde
Villages and settlements in Santiago, Cape Verde